Wilson Gómez (born 25 January 1995) is an Argentine professional footballer who plays as a forward for Villa San Carlos.

Club career
Gómez played for the academies of Huracán de Chabás and, from 2007, Independiente. In 2016, Gómez completed a move to Primera B Metropolitana's Villa San Carlos. He made ten appearances in his first season, 2016–17, as he also scored the first goals of his career, netting in matches against Excursionistas and UAI Urquiza. After seven goals in twenty-eight matches in 2017–18 as Villa San Carlos were relegated, Gómez was signed on loan by Chacarita Juniors of Primera B Nacional on 12 July 2018. His debut arrived on 1 September versus Platense. He returned to his parent club at the end of the year.

In January 2019, Gómez was loaned to third tier side Comunicaciones.

International career
In 2014, Gómez was called up to represent the Argentina U20s in Spain at the Copa del Atlántico; a tournament they won.

Career statistics
.

References

External links

1995 births
Living people
Sportspeople from Santa Fe Province
Argentine footballers
Argentina youth international footballers
Argentina under-20 international footballers
Association football forwards
Primera B Metropolitana players
Primera Nacional players
Club Atlético Villa San Carlos footballers
Chacarita Juniors footballers
Club Comunicaciones footballers